Martta Maria Wendelin (23 November 1893 in Kymi — 1 March 1986 in Tuusula) was a Finnish painter.

She illustrated fairy tales and school books, and drew postcards and magazine covers. The high time of her career was in 1930s, when magazines were able to use good quality images, but use of photographs was not yet that common.

References

External links 
 Biography by T. Karjalainen in Kansallisbiografia. 

1893 births
1986 deaths
20th-century Finnish painters
20th-century Finnish women artists